Mia Korf (born November 1, 1965) is an American actress best known for originating the role of Blair Daimler Buchanan in One Life to Live.

Early life and education
Korf is the daughter of mycologist Richard P. Korf and Kumiko ("Kumi"), née Tachibana, a fine artist specializing in printmaking. Korf grew up in Ithaca, New York and attended Cornell University, where she lived in Risley Residential College.

Career
Korf began her career in television in 1990 on the NBC series The Days and Nights of Molly Dodd and the soap opera Loving. The following year, she was cast as the original Blair Daimler Buchanan on the ABC daytime drama, One Life to Live. The character of Blair had many characteristics in common with Korf, including details about her birthplace, horoscope sign (Scorpio) and hobbies. In early 1993, she left the series to appear in the Broadway stage play Face Value, a farcical musical. 

She has since continued to appear in numerous prime-time television series, including: Players, Party of Five, Danny, Becker, NYPD Blue, Chicago Hope, Nip/Tuck, The Agency, North Shore, Hawaii, Crossing Jordan, Strong Medicine, Cold Case, and most recently Eli Stone. She has also appeared in the feature films Blood Brothers and Jerry Maguire. Korf voiced Theresa Cook in W.I.T.C.H., in D is for Dangerous, K is for Knowledge and P is for Protectors.

Personal life
Korf was married to actor Jeffrey Lebeau. She lives in Los Angeles, California.

Filmography

Film

Television

References

External links

Mia Korf's Biography

American soap opera actresses
American television actresses
American film actresses
American actresses of Japanese descent
American film actors of Asian descent
Cornell University alumni
Living people
1965 births
People from Ithaca, New York
21st-century American women
Ithaca High School (Ithaca, New York) alumni